The 1911–12 Wisconsin Badgers men's basketball team represented University of Wisconsin–Madison. The head coach was Walter Meanwell, coaching his first season with the Badgers. The team played their home games at the Red Gym in Madison, Wisconsin and was a member of the Western Conference. The team finished the season with a 15–0 record and was retroactively named the national champion by the Helms Athletic Foundation and the Premo-Porretta Power Poll.

Schedule

|-
!colspan=12| Regular Season

References

Wisconsin Badgers men's basketball seasons
Wisconsin
NCAA Division I men's basketball tournament championship seasons
Wisconsin Badger
Wisconsin Badger